The Torneio Internacional de Futebol Feminino (English: International Women's Football Tournament) is an annual global invitational tournament for national teams in women's association football. Held every December in Brazil since 2009, the first four editions took place in São Paulo and Brasília hosted the 2013 and 2014 competitions. The 2015 edition will be hosted by Natal. Initially, it was organized by the Municipal Prefecture of São Paulo and the Federação Paulista de Futebol (FPF). Three teams are invited to take part alongside Brazil. All matches in a particular tournament are staged at a single venue: Estádio do Pacaembu, in São Paulo, Estádio Nacional Mané Garrincha in Brasília and Arena das Dunas in Natal. In 2016, the tournament was moved to Manaus.

In September 2017, competition organizers announced that the 2017 tournament would be cancelled and the tournament would switch to a bi-yearly format beginning in 2018. These plans fell through and no tournament was played in 2018.

In 2019, due to increased interest in Women's football surrounding the 2019 FIFA Women's World Cup, it was announced that the tournament would return for 2019 as the Torneio UBER Internacional de Futebol Feminino, to be played from August 29 to September 1.

The tournament has been won on eight occasions by the hosts and once each by Canada and Chile.

History

Format

Results

Results by nation

Participating nations

General statistics

Top scorers by year

See also

 International competitions in women's association football
 FIFA Women's World Cup
 Women's Olympic Football Tournament
 Cyprus Women's Cup
 SheBelieves Cup
 Turkish Women's Cup

References

External links 
 Results at Rec.Sport.Soccer Statistics Foundation
 2014 International Tournament of Brasilia (English)

 
International women's association football competitions hosted by Brazil
International women's association football invitational tournaments
Recurring sporting events established in 2009
2009 establishments in Brazil